État 42-001 to 42-020, was a class of 2-8-2 Tank locomotives of the Chemins de Fer de l'État.

Design
Studies were led in parallel with the one of the 140 C. The 42-000s were of simple expansion with two cylinders and possessed the powerful fireboxes of the 140-100s. Although the fireboxes were excellent, the rest was of average quality with cylinders particularly of small diameter. The Chemin de fer de l'État chose small wheels to give the engines the capacity for quick acceleration. The railway company was very satisfied with the engines as they were capable of hauling the heavy steel coaches.

Construction
This series of 20 engines, numbered 42-001 to 42-020, was built by Fives-Lille and was allocated to the Batignolles motive power depot. Although they were designed in 1913, production was delayed by World War I until 1923, when the Chemins de Fer de l'État took delivery.

Service
They were designed to serve in the western suburbs of Paris. In 1930, the engines were equipped with for push-pull operation. The driver could operate the engine from the driving cabin of a Voiture État à 2 étages carriage at the other end of the train, using compressed-air pipes. This saved much time at terminals. The engines were modified, primarily with the addition of a smoke deflector and a closed cab. The 42-000s were renumbered 3-141.TC 1 to 20 by the SNCF in 1938.

The electrification of the Réseau Saint-Lazare moved the engines to Brittany. The last of the series were allocated to the St-Brieux depot and rented to the Société générale de chemins de fer et de transport automobile (CFTA) after Réseau Breton lines between Carhaix and Paimpol had been re-gauged from metre gauge to standard gauge. The last 141.TC was withdrawn in 1971.

Preservation
One locomotive has been preserved: 42-019, later SNCF 3-141.TC.19 (Fives-Lille 4328 of 1923) is preserved by AJECTA at the Musée vivant du chemin de fer in Longueville, Seine-et-Marne, and has been designated a Monument historique.

References

.42-001
2-8-2T locomotives
Fives-Lille locomotives
Railway locomotives introduced in 1923
Standard gauge locomotives of France
Passenger locomotives